Kharrazan (also Romanized as Kharrāzān and Kharāzān; also known as Khurāzān) is a village in Kharrazan Rural District, in the Central District of Tafresh County, Markazi Province, Iran. At the 2006 census, its population was 47, in 24 families.

References 

Populated places in Tafresh County